St Mark's Church is an Anglican church in the middle of Myddelton Square, the largest square in London's Clerkenwell district.

The square was laid out by William Chadwell Mylne, and there are 75 houses, by 13 different builders, all constructed in a Georgian style, from 1822 to 1843.

St Mark's Church was built in 1825–27, and designed by William Chadwell Mylne. It is in a plain Gothic style, was built to accommodate 2000 people and cost about £18,000.

The east window depicts the Ascension and was designed by AE Buss of Goddard & Gibbs in 1962.

The converted Church Hall and Chapel rooms have been shared with the World Community for Christian Meditation since 2002.

The church is Grade II listed.

References

External links

 

Church of England church buildings in the London Borough of Islington
Churches completed in 1827
19th-century Church of England church buildings
Commissioners' church buildings
Grade II listed churches in London
1827 establishments in England
Gothic Revival church buildings in London